Fisherrow is a harbour and former fishing village at Musselburgh, East Lothian, Scotland, to the east of Portobello and Joppa, and west of the River Esk.

History
There has been fishing at Fisherrow and Musselburgh since Roman times, and the present 17th-century harbour is very close to the Roman harbour at the mouth of the River Esk that served the Inveresk Roman Fort on the high ground east of the Esk upriver. The Fisherrow fishermen used to fish for herring, and later for white fish, prawns and sprats. The harbour was home to a large fishing fleet.

Fishing villages were close-knit communities, and there was a Fishwives' Choir, and golf tournaments took place between the fishwives of Musselburgh and Fisherrow. Fishermen and fishwives held a "Box Walk" each September which marked the end of the fishing season, and an opportunity to give presents of money to those in need.

In 1939, the Firth of Forth became a strategic area for the Royal Navy and the Royal Air Force, and fishing activities were curtailed. Fishermen's Associations and politicians protested against this, and some of the restrictions were lifted. But despite this, many fishermen were called up, and the Navy commandeered some of the boats for war service.

Present

The harbour is now predominantly used by leisure craft. Fisherrow Yacht Club offers dinghy and yacht sailing.

The local Sea Cadets receive training at Fisherrow Harbour and at their Unit in South Street.

Fisherrow Harbour is home to Eskmuthe Rowing Club which rows skiffs as part of the Scottish Coastal Rowing Association.

Fisherrow is on the John Muir Way, a long-distance footpath along the East Lothian coast, terminating in Helensburgh.

Fisherrow Links offers nine-hole pitch and putt, as well as bowling greens.

Fisherrow Sands is sandy beach to the west of Fisherrow harbour.

Fisherrow Waterfront Group is a community group who are working to improve the appearance and amenity of the Fisherrow Waterfront and ensure the community can play a part in the area.

In Literature
Part of Some Terrible Letters from Scotland, James Hogg's response to the cholera epidemic of 1831-32 first published in the Metropolitan magazine in April 1832, is set in Fisherrow.  Musselburgh and Fisherrow were particularly severely affected by the epidemic.

See also
List of places in East Lothian

Photo gallery

References

External links
History of Fisherrow, by local historians
Old photos

Musselburgh
Populated places in East Lothian